Katy Bødtger (28 December 1932 – 1 May 2017) was a Danish singer.

Eurovision Song Contest 1960 
In 1960, Bødtger won the Dansk Melodi Grand Prix with the song "Det var en yndig tid" (It was a lovely time). Later on that year Bødtger sang the song at the Eurovision Song Contest 1960, coming joint tenth place with the Swedish entry "Alla andra får varann" (All the others get each other) sung by Siw Malmkvist, receiving four points.

References

External links

1932 births
2017 deaths
20th-century Danish women singers
Eurovision Song Contest entrants for Denmark
Eurovision Song Contest entrants of 1960
Musicians from Copenhagen